Arhopala selta or reddish-brown oakblue, is a butterfly in the family Lycaenidae. It was described by William Chapman Hewitson in 1869. It is found in the Indomalayan realm.

Subspecies
A. s. selta Burma, Mergui, Peninsular Malaya, Thailand, Sumatra
A. s. constanceae  de Nicéville, 1894  Andaman Islands
A. s. hislopi  Eliot, 1962  Malaysia

References

External links
Arhopala Boisduval, 1832 at Markku Savela's Lepidoptera and Some Other Life Forms. Retrieved June 3, 2017.

Arhopala
Butterflies described in 1869